CRI or CRi may refer to:

Organizations
 Canadian Rivers Institute, for river sciences, University of New Brunswick
 Cancer Research Institute, New York, US
 Centro de Relaciones Internacionales (International Relations Center), Universidad Nacional Autónoma de México
 Crime Reduction Initiatives, later Change, Grow, Live, England and Wales
 Charlotte Research Institute, a technology-focused partnership, US
 China Radio International
 Christian Research Institute, Charlotte, North Carolina, US
 Community Rowing, Inc., Boston, Massachusetts, US
 Croce Rossa Italiana, the Italian Red Cross
 Crown Research Institutes, New Zealand

Businesses
 CRI Middleware, a Japanese software developer
 Carbon Recycling International, Iceland
 Composers Recordings, Inc., a former US record label
 Computer Resources International, a Danish aerospace company

Places
 Costa Rica, ISO 3166-1 code

Buildings
 Cardiff Royal Infirmary, Wales
 Cricklewood railway station, London, England, station code

Science and technology
 Color rendering index, of a light source

Other uses
 Chechen Republic of Ichkeria, a former secessionist government
 CRi, Canadian electronic musician

See also
 Cri Cri (disambiguation)
 Cry